Nikola Kastner (born 1983 in Hamburg, West Germany) is an actress who has appeared in numerous German films and television productions. She is best known internationally for her roles in Homeland and Deutschland 83.

She took private acting lessons as a child and from 2000 to 2002 appeared on stage at the Deutsches Schauspielhaus in Hamburg. Her film roles include Black Forest (2010), Phoenix and The Origin of Violence (2016).

References

External links 
 
 Nikola Kastner at Goldschmidt Management (German language)
 Nikola Kastner at www.castingdb.eu (German language)

Living people
1983 births
German film actresses
German television actresses
Actresses from Hamburg
Date of birth missing (living people)
German stage actresses
German child actresses
21st-century German actresses